Morris Sawyer Tremaine (February 27, 1871 – October 12, 1941) was an American businessman and Democratic Party politician from Buffalo, New York. He served as New York State Comptroller for almost 14 years.

Life
Tremaine was born in Fort Dodge, Kansas on February 27, 1871. He was the son of Dr. William Scott Tremaine, an army surgeon from New York stationed at Fort Dodge, who was among the founders of the Town of Dodge City, Kansas in 1872. Tremaine lived with his family at Fort Dodge and in Cobourg, Ontario, Canada before they settled in Buffalo, New York when he was 10 years old.

Tremaine attended both public and private schools in Buffalo, and graduated from Upper Canada College in Toronto at the age of 17. He started work at age 17 as a tally boy on the Buffalo docks for the Holland, Graves & Montgomery wholesale lumber firm. (Tally boys aided ship's crews and merchants in the counting and weighing of cargo being loaded and unloaded.) He worked his way through the company ranks to become a salesman, and later opened and managed a New York City branch office.

In 1897, Tremaine was appointed secretary of a wholesale lumber business, Montgomery Bros. & Co. In 1903 he was appointed president of the Toledo Fire & Marine Insurance Company. In 1905 he was named president of the National Lumber Insurance Company of Buffalo. Also in 1905, Tremaine became vice president of the Montgomery Lumber Company of Suffolk, Virginia. In 1914, he joined the J. G. Wilson Corporation, makers of rolling steel doors and folding partitions, and he was the company's president when he retired in 1930. In 1923, he was elected vice president of Smith, Fassett & Co., a wholesale lumber dealer in North Tonawanda, New York. Tremaine served on the board of directors of the National Wholesale Lumber Association. He was also an organizer of the King Sewing Machine Company, which was later purchased by Sears, Roebuck & Co.

During World War I Tremaine was involved in organizing several Liberty Loan bond drives, in addition to being one of the largest purchasers of the bonds himself.

Tremaine was New York State Comptroller from 1927 to 1941, elected in 1926, 1928, 1930, 1932, 1934, 1936, and 1938. He died in Albany, New York on October 12, 1941, while in the middle of his seventh term. He was buried at Forest Lawn Cemetery in Buffalo.

Family
On June 21, 1898, he married Maude Middledith in Plainfield, New Jersey. They were the parents of two sons, businessmen Lawrence Tremaine of Buffalo, and James G. Tremaine of New York City.

References

External links
The Political Graveyard: Index to Politicians: Trelease to Trimbell at politicalgraveyard.com Political Graveyard
Quotes by Morris S. Tremaine at www.famousquotes.com Famous Quotes.com
 The Securities Act of 1933, in TIME magazine on May 21, 1934
EARLY FORD COUNTY, by Ida Ellen Rath, Ch. 3 | Dodge City Town Company | Dodge City, Kansas KS at skyways.lib.ks.us The Dodge City Town Company, at skyways

1871 births
1941 deaths
Upper Canada College alumni
New York (state) Democrats
New York State Comptrollers
Businesspeople from Buffalo, New York
People from Ford County, Kansas
Burials at Forest Lawn Cemetery (Buffalo)
Politicians from Buffalo, New York